The 2016 FINA Women's Water Polo World League was the 13th edition of the annual women's international water polo tournament. It was played between November 2015 and June 2016 and open to all women's water polo national teams. After participating in a preliminary round, eight teams qualify to play in a final tournament, called the Super Final in Shanghai, China from 07–12 June 2016.

In the world league, there are specific rules that do not allow matches to end in a draw.  If teams are level at the end of the 4th quarter of any world league match, the match will be decided by a penalty shootout. Teams earn points in the standings in group matches as follows:
 Match won in normal time - 3 points
 Match won in shootout - 2 points
 Match lost in shootout - 1 point
 Match lost in normal time - 0 points

Europe

Preliminary round 
The European preliminary round consisted of two group of four teams. The winner of each group after the home and away series of games qualifies for the Super Final. A third place is taken by the best scoring second-placed team.

Group A

Squads 
 
Squad as during the match on 12 April against Italy.

 
Squad as during the match on 12 April against France.

Group B

Intercontinental Qualification Tournament

Preliminary round

5th place

3rd Place

Final

Super Final
In the Super Final the eight qualifying teams are split into two groups of four teams with all teams progressing to the knock-out stage. The games were played in Shanghai, China from 7 to 12 June 2016.

Qualified teams

Group A

Group B

Knockout stage

5th–8th Places

Quarterfinals

5th–8th Places Semifinals

Semifinals

7th place

5th place

3rd Place

Final

Final ranking 

Team Roster
Sami Hill, Maddie Musselman, Melissa Seidemann, Rachel Fattal, Caroline Clark, Maggie Steffens (C), Courtney Mathewson,  Kiley Neushul, Aria Fischer, Kaleigh Gilchrist , Makenzie Fischer, Kami Craig, Ashleigh Johnson, Alys Williams. Head coach: Adam Krikorian.

References

World League, women
2016
International water polo competitions hosted by China